Carlos Dominguez may refer to:

 Carlos Domínguez (weightlifter) (born 1922), Peruvian weightlifter
 Carlos Domínguez Rodríguez (1941–2018), Mexican journalist
 Carlos Dominguez III (born 1945), Filipino businessman
 Carlos María Domínguez (born 1955), Argentine journalist and writer
 Carlos Domínguez (Spanish footballer) (born 2001), Spanish football defender
 Carlos Domínguez (Venezuelan footballer)
 "Carlos Dominguez", a song written by Paul Simon in 1963 and released under his pseudonym Paul Kane

See also
 Carlitos (footballer, born 1976), born Carlos Domínguez Domínguez, Spanish football forward